Carlos Moyá was the defending champion but lost in the semifinals to Mariano Zabaleta.

Zabaleta won in the final 6–3, 6–4 against Nicolás Lapentti.

Seeds
A champion seed is indicated in bold text while text in italics indicates the round in which that seed was eliminated.

  Carlos Moyá (semifinals)
  Tommy Robredo (semifinals)
  Younes El Aynaoui (first round)
  Mikhail Youzhny (quarterfinals)
  Mariano Zabaleta (champion)
  Nicolás Lapentti (final)
  Fernando Vicente (first round)
  Alberto Martín (first round)

Draw

External links
 Main draw
 Qualifying draw

Men's Singles
Singles